The hansom cab is a kind of horse-drawn carriage designed and patented in 1834 by Joseph Hansom, an architect from York. The vehicle was developed and tested by Hansom in Hinckley, Leicestershire, England. Originally called the Hansom safety cab, it was designed to combine speed with safety, with a low centre of gravity for safe cornering.  Hansom's original design was modified by John Chapman and several others to improve its practicability, but retained Hansom's name.

Cab is a shortening of cabriolet, reflecting the design of the carriage.  It replaced the hackney carriage as a vehicle for hire; with the introduction of clockwork mechanical taximeters to measure fares, the name became taxicab.

Hansom cabs enjoyed immense popularity as they were fast, light enough to be pulled by a single horse (making the journey cheaper than travelling in a larger four-wheel coach) and were agile enough to steer around horse-drawn vehicles in the notorious traffic jams of nineteenth-century London. There were up to 7500 hansom cabs in use at the height of their popularity and they quickly spread to other cities in the United Kingdom (including Ireland), as well as continental European cities, particularly Paris, Berlin, and St Petersburg. The cab was introduced to other British Empire cities and to the United States during the late 19th century, being most commonly used in New York City.

Design 

The cab, a type of fly, sat two passengers (three if they squeezed in) and a driver who sat on a sprung seat behind the vehicle. The passengers could give their instructions to the driver through a trap door near the rear of the roof. They could pay the driver through the hatch, and he would then operate a lever to release the doors so that they could alight. In some cabs, the driver could operate a device that balanced the cab and reduced strain on the horse. The passengers were protected from the elements by the cab and by folding wooden doors that enclosed their feet and legs and thus protected their clothes from splashing mud. Later versions also had an up-and-over glass window above the doors to complete the enclosure of the passengers. Additionally, a curved fender mounted forward of the doors protected passengers from the stones thrown up by the hooves of the horse.

Hansom Cab Company 

The Hansom Cab Company was set up to provide transportation in New York City and Miami, New York, in May 1869. The business was located at 133 Water Street (Manhattan),  at the offices of Duncan, Sherman & Company, which served as bankers to the firm. The enterprise was organized by Ed W. Brandon who became its president. Two orders for a fleet of cabs were sent to carriage makers in New York City. A fare of thirty cents for a single person was designated for distances up to one mile, and forty cents for two people. A rate of seventy-five cents was determined for one or two persons for a length of time not exceeding one hour.

The cabs were widely used in the United Kingdom until 1908 when Taximeter Cars (petrol cabs) started to be introduced and were rapidly accepted; by the early 1920s horse-drawn cabs had largely been superseded by motor vehicles. The last licence for a horse-drawn cab in London was relinquished in 1947.

A restored hansom cab once owned by Alfred Gwynne Vanderbilt is on display at the Remington Carriage Museum in Cardston, Alberta, Canada. There is another surviving example, owned and operated by the Sherlock Holmes Museum in London; in common with other horse-drawn vehicles it is not permitted to enter any of the Royal Parks. Hinckley and Bosworth Borough Council, Leicestershire also have a restored Hansom cab.

In popular culture 
 In Black Beauty by Anna Sewell, the central section has an evocative account of life as a Hansom cab driver in Victorian London, even though it is written from the point of view of the horse.
 Sir Arthur Conan Doyle's Sherlock Holmes stories make frequent mention of hansom cabs. 
 "The Adventure of the Hansom Cab" is the third and final story in Robert Louis Stevenson's The Suicide Club cycle (1878). Retired British soldier Lieutenant Brackenbury Rich is beckoned into the back of an elegantly appointed hansom by a mysterious cabman who whisks him off to a party. 
 In 1886, Fergus Hume published his novel The Mystery of a Hansom Cab, set in post-Gold Rush era Melbourne, Australia. The story was filmed in Australia in 1911, under the same title. A movie was made for TV in 2012.
 The 1889 film Leisurely Pedestrians, Open Topped Buses and Hansom Cabs with Trotting Horses, photographed by William Friese-Greene, shows Londoners walking along Apsley Gate, Hyde Park, with horse-drawn conveyances passing by.
 The book Farewell Victoria (1933) by T. H. White has the protagonist ending his days as a hansom cab operator in its fading years, which is part of the sustained metaphor brought out in the title.
 The game Assassin's Creed: Syndicate, set in Victorian London, features Hansoms as a type of drivable carriage.

See also 
 Cabmen's Shelter Fund

References

Further reading 

Carriage Terminology: An Historical Dictionary by Donald H. Berkebile, Don H. Berkebile (1979)  
A Dictionary of Horse Drawn Vehicles by D.J.M. Smith (1988)
Looking at Carriages by Sallie Walrond (1992)

External links 

 America on the Move | Hansom Cab. National Museum of American History, Smithsonian Institution.
 Illustration and information on Carriage Association of America website.
 The Hansom Cab of the Sherlock Holmes Museum, London Sherlock Holmes International Society.
 Hansom Cabs Sherlock Peoria.
 Hutchinson encyclopedia article about hansom cab  Farlex, Inc.
 Fergus Hume, The Mystery of a Hansom Cab Project Gutenberg.
 Official website for Laurie R. King; features a cab-driving scene.
 Joseph Aloysius Hansom

Carriages
English inventions
Taxi vehicles
Vehicles introduced in 1834